Héctor Fabián Carini Hernández (born 26 December 1979 in Montevideo) is a Uruguayan former professional footballer who played as a goalkeeper.

Club career
Carini played for Uruguayan club Danubio F.C. for three seasons, before signing with Italian club Juventus in January 2001, where he spent two seasons and was used mainly as a substitute goalkeeper. In March 2002 he was handed a start against Arsenal in the UEFA Champions League due to Juventus rotating their squad having already qualified for the next round of the competition. He played well and saved a Thierry Henry penalty as Juventus won 1–0. Although Juventus finished the 2001–02 season as Serie A champions, Carini did not play in the league, as he served as the team's back-up goalkeeper behind Gianluigi Buffon; however, he was the team's starting goalkeeper in the Coppa Italia, ahead of Michelangelo Rampulla, where the team reached the final, only to lose out to Parma. Shortly afterwards during the summer of 2002, he nearly completed a loan move to Arsenal, but at the last minute, the move fell through due to the player's wage demands. He moved instead to Standard Liège, where he spent two years on loan.

In 2004, Carini left Juventus for Internazionale, when he was exchanged for Fabio Cannavaro in a transfer which was worth €10 million. Despite being the first choice goalkeeper for his country, Carini was the third choice goalkeeper for Inter. After spending the 2005–06 season on loan at Cagliari, he went back to Inter, where he became the fourth goalkeeper behind Francesco Toldo, Júlio César and Paolo Orlandoni. Carini did not see a single minute of action over the next two years, a period during which Inter won the Serie A title in 2007. Before the 2007–08 season, he moved to newly promoted Spanish club Murcia to compete with incumbent first-choice goalkeeper Antonio Notario. He signed a three-year deal with the Brazilian club Atlético Mineiro in 2008, arriving on a free transfer. Atlético Mineiro rescinded Fabián Carini's contract in 2010; as a result, they had to a penalty to him, as his contract with the club ran until 2011.

After his experience at Atletico Mineiro, the 31-year-old goalkeeper Fabian Carini signed a one-season deal with Peñarol in December of that year.

He later played for Deportivo Quito in 2013, and signed with Juventud de Las Piedras in 2014. When his contract with the latter club expired at the end of 2016, Carini decided to retire from professional football, due to cronic lumbar pain, despite having an offer to play in the Copa Libertadores with Montevideo Wanderers.

International career
Carini played for the Uruguay national football team, which he represented at the 1999 and 2007 editions of the Copa América – earning second and fourth–place finishes respectively – as well as the 2002 FIFA World Cup, where his nation suffered a first–round elimination. Carini made his debut for the national squad on 17 June 1999 in a friendly match (2–3 win) in Ciudad del Este against Paraguay. In total he obtained 74 caps between 1999 and 2009.

Career statistics

International

Honours

Club
Juventus
Serie A: 2001–02

Inter
Coppa Italia: 2004–05
Supercoppa Italiana: 2006
Serie A: 2006–07

International

Copa América: 1999 (runners-up)

References

External links

Profile at Tenfield 
Profile at France Football 
Profile at L'Équipe 

1979 births
Living people
Uruguayan footballers
Association football goalkeepers
Uruguayan people of Italian descent
Uruguay under-20 international footballers
Uruguay international footballers
Uruguayan Primera División players
Serie A players
Belgian Pro League players
La Liga players
Campeonato Brasileiro Série A players
Ecuadorian Serie A players
Peñarol players
Danubio F.C. players
Standard Liège players
Juventus F.C. players
Inter Milan players
Real Murcia players
Cagliari Calcio players
Clube Atlético Mineiro players
S.D. Quito footballers
Juventud de Las Piedras players
2002 FIFA World Cup players
1999 Copa América players
2007 Copa América players
Footballers from Montevideo
Expatriate footballers in Belgium
Expatriate footballers in Italy
Expatriate footballers in Spain
Expatriate footballers in Brazil
Expatriate footballers in Ecuador
Uruguayan expatriate footballers
Uruguayan expatriate sportspeople in Belgium
Uruguayan expatriate sportspeople in Italy
Uruguayan expatriate sportspeople in Spain